Young Black Brotha is the 1993 debut LP by Mac Dre, not to be confused with an earlier Mac Dre release, Young Black Brotha (EP). The album contains several new recordings as well as most of the tracks from the rapper's previous EP, What's Really Going On?, and three tracks from the sessions for Back N' Da Hood, including the full version of "My Chevy" featuring Mac Mall – the first 1 and a half minutes appeared on the original EP. Some of Mac Dre's vocals were recorded over the phone from prison, after being incarcerated for a string of bank robberies in 1992. Young Black Brotha peaked at #93 on the R&B/Hip-Hop Albums chart, making it Mac Dre's most commercially successful work.

Track listing

References

Young Black Brotha at Discogs (list of versions)
In depth review of album at rapreviews.com
High definition images of Mac Dre - Young Black Brotha (The Album) front and back album covers at rapmusicguide.com or through Google Images

1993 debut albums
Mac Dre albums
Gangsta rap albums by American artists
G-funk albums